Marcin Pietroń (born 24 January 1986 in Zielona Góra) is a Polish footballer who plays as a midfielder for SPKL Stag in Norway.

Career
Pietroń was a member of the Zagłębie Lubin side which won the 2006–07 Ekstraklasa, scoring four goals in eleven reserve appearances in the league. He didn't live up to his early potential and spent the end of his career in the lower levels of Norwegian football.

References

External links
 

1986 births
Living people
Arka Gdynia players
Zagłębie Lubin players
Piast Gliwice players
GKS Katowice players
IF Fram Larvik players
Polish footballers
Polish expatriate footballers
Expatriate footballers in Norway
Polish expatriate sportspeople in Norway
People from Zielona Góra
Sportspeople from Lubusz Voivodeship
Association football midfielders